Phi Sigma Chi may refer to:

Phi Sigma Chi (Defiance), a local fraternity formed in 1967 at Defiance College in Defiance, OH, which became the Ohio Omicron chapter of Sigma Phi Epsilon on 